Te Pūkenga – New Zealand Institute of Skills and Technology is the largest vocational education provider in New Zealand. In February 2019, the Government announced that the country's sixteen Institutes of Technology and Polytechnics (ITPs) would merge to form the new organisation; the merger was effective on 1 April 2020. In addition to the polytechnics, Te Pūkenga  also took over responsibility for industry training and apprenticeship training from most of the industry training organisations (ITOs). Te Pūkenga's head office is located in Hamilton and with Peter Winder serving as acting chief executive.

Organisational description
Te Pūkenga has almost 13,000 staff, 240,000 students, and assets worth NZ$2 billion. The student body includes those studying at New Zealand's 16 ITPs, and various apprentice and industry training programmes. Since mid-August 2022, the national polytechnic is led by Acting CEO Peter Winder.

Te Pūkenga's legislative framework is the Education (Vocational Education and Training Reform) Amendment Act 2020. This bill amended the Education Act 1989 and repealed the Industry Training and Apprenticeships Act 1992 to create a unified and cohesive vocational education and training system. The bill passed its third reading on 19 February 2020 and received royal assent on 24 February 2020.

History

Background
Chris Hipkins, the Minister of Education, announced in February 2018 that the education sector—from preschool to tertiary—was up for review. The details were outlined in a cabinet paper and this included "a programme of change for the institute of technology and polytechnic (ITP) subsector and for vocational education more generally". After consultation with the education sector, Hipkins released a proposal in February 2019 that went much further than the options discussed in consultation, with all 16 ITPs to merge into one organisation.

The 16 ITPs were:

Hipkins admitted that "change on this scale will be disruptive". This merger was confirmed on 1 August 2019 alongside the working title "New Zealand Institute of Skills & Technology", and the following day, Hipkins announced the membership of an establishment ten-person-board based in the Christchurch suburb of Addington and starting work on 5 August 2019:

Regions were invited to submit proposals for the head office location. The Government Electronic Tendering Service (GETS) asked for registrations of interest from 6 December 2019 to 15 January 2020. The outcome was to be announced in March 2020 but when New Zealand went into lockdown due to the coronavirus pandemic, this process was put on hold.

The Minister of Education announced the first seven members of the governing council on 18 March 2020:

Chris Collins, the chief executive of Eastern Institute of Technology, was appointed interim chief executive for NZIST. Stephen Town, former CEO of Auckland Council; was appointed chief executive for NZIST. He started his new role at the end of June 2020, with a salary of NZ$688,235.

Naming
Forty Māori language names were under consideration for the organisation, and by 2 March 2020, five of those had been shortlisted:
 Korowai Mātauranga (A journey under the guidance and protection of a cloak of expertise)
 Pūkenga Aotearoa (A skills-based Institute with Aotearoa at its heart)
 Takiura Aotearoa (Traditional learning places for knowledge of a higher level)
 Te Pū Mātauranga (A foundation or source of knowledge)
 Te Rau Mātangi (A supported journey to gain knowledge and understanding)

It was expected that the name would be decided before the start of NZIST but the Establishment Board asked for more time.

In September 2020, Chris Hipkins announced the institute's permanent name, Te Pūkenga – New Zealand Institute of Skills and Technology. The name describes the "gaining and mastery of valuable skills through passing knowledge down from person to person". The individual institutes of technology/polytechnics (ITPs) will retain their current trading names, while their legal names will change to reflect the fact that they are subsidiaries of Te Pūkenga.

Transition

Merger process
As part of the planned transition into a single mega polytechnic entity, all 16 Institutes of Technology and Polytechnics (ITPs) and most industry training organisations would be absorbed into Te Pūkenga on 1 January 2023; thus losing their individual identities and becoming one national mega polytechnic.

In late May 2022, Radio New Zealand reported that a March 2022 document indicated that independent reviewers had expressed concerns about the future of Te Pūkenga. The report highlighted tensions between the vocational education provider and the Tertiary Education Commission (TEC) over what Te Pūkenga would be providing when it takes over responsibility of the ITPs on 1 January 2023. The report also expressed concerns that the institutes of technology/polytechnics were not well prepared for the transition and lacked direction from Te Pūkenga on how to prepare for the transition. In addition, the report stated that Te Pūkenga had been slow to develop its information technology and financial back-office functions in anticipation for the transition. The report warned that the vocational provider might not be financially viable and that the consolidation process could take longer than planned and fail to meet its goals. Following the report's release, chief executive Town stated that Te Pūkenga had accepted all of the review's recommendations and was in the process of implementing them. By contrast, the opposition National Party tertiary education spokesperson Penny Simmonds urged the government to abandon its plan to merge the polytechnics into a national entity and instead invest in struggling institutions. 

On 23 June 2022, Te Pūkenga released its first annual report, which covered the period between 1 January and 31 December 2021. According to Town, key achievements for the 2021 academic year included publishing world-leading academic research, producing 48,734 graduates (a 77.5% graduation rate), establishing Te Pūkenga Work Based Learning to facilitate the transition of former industry training organisations, and establishing interim staff, student and Māori committees to aid with the transition. That same day, the Tertiary Education Union described efforts to consolidate the education curricula of the various polytechnics into a new streamlined curriculum as "rushed and disrespectful." They claimed that consolidation process would do little to address the national shortage of nurses and social workers.

On 11 July, the National Party's tertiary education spokesperson Simmonds criticised the Te Pūkenga model for failing to improve struggling polytechnics while discouraging good performers. She also criticised the creation of 180 Hamilton head office jobs in the light of 600 projected redundancies resulting from the merger process. According to Simmonds, the Government had spent NZ$200 million on merging the polytechnics into Te Pūkenga. She also suggested that the NZ$110 million deficit was higher than reported. Simmonds claimed that Town's departure on "special leave" was a sign of trouble with the new entity. Similar issues about the centralisation of the polytechnics was also raised by an Otago Daily Times editorial in mid–July 2022 which expressed concerns about its impact on high-performing institutions such as Otago Polytechnic and Southern Institute of Technology. The editorial also described the creation of Te Pūkenga as part of the Labour Government's centralisation policies alongside the former district health boards and the Three Waters reform programme.

In mid-July 2022, the 16 polytechnics and four industrial training organisations commenced "combined branding" to raise awareness of their planned merger into Te Pūkenga in early January 2023. The rebrand was managed by marketing company Clemenger BBDO. Acting CEO Winder stated that the mega polytechnic would provide campus-based, online, and job-based training while reducing duplication of resources and competition between local institutions.

On 28 July, former Otago Polytechnic chief executive Phil Ker described the Education Minister Chris Hipkins's efforts to merge the polytechnics into a single entity as a "national disgrace," citing Te Pūkenga's beleaguered financial situation and merger transition delays. Ker argued that the reforms failed to address the polytechnic sector's inadequate funding and stated that the merger transition process would lead to extensive staff redundancies across the entire sector. Ker suggested that Te Pūkenga could be revamped as a central agency that provided guidance and education support to the various polytechnics. Hipkins defended his Government's polytechnic merger policy, stating that the previous model had created unnecessary competition and was not delivering the skilled workers that employers and businesses needed. Hipkins stated that the new model would encourage local innovation and improve connections with local businesses to tackle skills shortages.

On 4 August, acting-chief executive Winder indicated that Te Pūkenga would be adopting a "unified fees approach" for all its campuses in the near future. While its subsidiary Southland Institute of Technology would maintain its zero fees policy for the 2023 academic year, this would be discontinued in 2024. 

On 23 August, Te Pūkenga announced that three further transitional industry training organisations Careerforce, New Zealand Hair, Beauty and Barbering Industry Training Organisation (HITO), and Primary Industry Training Organisation (Primary ITO) would merge into the mega polytechnic between 1 September and 1 October 2022. These three entities would become business divisions of Te Pūkenga's subsidiary Work Based Learning Limited (WBL). Other business divisions of WBL have included Competenz, Connexis, BCITO, MITO and ServiceIQ.

Leadership resignations
By mid–April 2021, Stuff reported that eight of the sixteen polytechnic chief executives had resigned since their institutions were merged into Te Pūkenga a year ago. The chief executive roles at Te Pūkenga's ITP subsidiaries are expected to expire at the end of 2022 with management shifting to a central executive team headed by Chief Executive Town and six deputies. Former Otago Polytechnic CEO Phil Ker attributed the resignations to fears about impending job losses in the new vocational education provider. Former Southern Institute of Technology CEO and National Party tertiary education spokesperson Simmonds also expressed concern that the resignation of polytechnic CEOs was depriving the polytechnic sector of experienced senior managers. By contrast, TEC chief executive Tim Fowler expressed confidence in Te Pūkenga's leadership while Tertiary Education Union national president Tina Smith opined that the new polytechnic system was preferable to the previous model of "competing fiefdoms." 

On 20 April 2021 Merran Davis resigned from her position as Te Pūkenga's deputy chief executive for transformation and transition. Davis had been appointed to the position in April 2020. Davis had previously served as chief executive of the Waikato Institute of Technology until 2014. In response, the National Party's education spokesperson Simmonds suggested that Davis' resignation reflected problems with the polytechnic merger process.  

On 8 July 2022, Chief Executive Stephen Town took "personal leave" for unspecified reasons with Te Pūkenga council member Peter Winder serving as acting chief executive in the interim. On 10 July, the Waikato Times reported that a memo by Tertiary Education Commission deputy chief executive Gillian Dudgeon to the Education Minister Hipkins identified several problems facing the national polytechnic provider including a lack of leadership, a deficit of NZ$110 million due to a 12% drop in enrollments compared with 2021 (which exceeded the organisation's budget of NZ$57.5 million), and inaction over improving Te Pūkenga's financial state. The TEC memo also disclosed that chief executive Town was earning an annual salary over NZ$670,000; which exceeded Prime Minister Jacinda Ardern's annual salary of NZ$471,049. In response to media coverage, Hipkins defended the transition progress and attributed the low enrolment figures to record low unemployment and plentiful job opportunities.

On 27 July, Education Minister Hipkins ruled out calls by former Te Pūkenga senior executive Merran Davis to place a commissioner in charge of the entity at the time. However, he stated that he would reconsider appointing a commissioner to head the organisation.

On 16 August 2022, Town formally resigned his position as CEO of Te Pūkenga. His responsibilities and duties were assumed by Acting-CEO Peter Winder. In response to Town's resignation, Simmonds suggested that Town had been made a scapegoat by Te Pūkenga's governing board and recommended that the Auditor-General investigate the circumstances behind Town's resignation.

On 14 September, Te Pūkenga's chief financial officer Matthew Walker resigned. Walker had assumed the position in July 2022. Winder confirmed that an interim financial officer had been appointed in Walker's absence and that the organisation was working on improving its financial situation. In response, Simmonds claimed that Walker's resignation reflected systemic problems with an organisation that had trouble managing its finances. Simmonds also stated that a future National-led government would disestablish Te Pūkenga and transfer the polytechnics back to their communities.

Staff consultation and proposed redundancies
On 3 August 2022, Chairperson Murray Strong apologised to Te Pūkenga staff members for not listening to their concerns, appreciating their expertise, and for delays in transitioning into a single institution. Strong and acting chief-executive Winder also appeared before Parliament's education select committee to answer questions about delays in the transition process, how it was dealing with its financial constraints, and working with staff members. Strong confirmed that Te Pūkenga was working to reduce its deficit to NZ$50 million and that Winder would oversee the transition process until the end of 2022. These cost-cutting measures have included reducing head office expenses by NZ$8 million.

On 15 August, Winder announced that Te Pūkenga had begun consulting its over 13,000 employees on its proposed leadership structure and business groups. The mega polytechnic proposes creating seven networks based around seven vocational pathways and creating four regional subdivisions.

On 26 August, Radio New Zealand reported that a Tertiary Education Commission report dated 9 June 2022 had proposed reducing staff numbers at Te Pūkenga's subsidiary polytechnics in order to avert a forecast deficit of NZ$110 million. The report described Te Pūkenga's efforts to combat the deficit such as requiring frequent financial reports from polytechnics and restricting the recruitment of new staff as insufficient. The briefing paper also forecast that the completion of Te Pūkenga's merger process in January 2023 could save the institution NZ$52 million a year.

In early September 2022, Newsroom reported that the delayed public consultation on Te Pūkenga's organisational structure had failed to allay staff concerns about job security. Newsroom also reported unusually high turnover rates across the subsidiary polytechnics. Te Pūkenga also revised its forecast annual deficit to NZ$63 million, which included staff resignations and "one-off" land sales which had not been finalised. Tertiary Education Union president Tina Smith reported that many staff were anxious about the uncertainty and lack of information about their job specifications within the organisation's operating structure. National Party tertiary education spokesperson Simmonds criticised Te Pūkenga's efforts to reduce its deficit via redundancies and asset sales as an unsustainable financial model. 

On 8 September, the Otago Polytechnic Branch of the Tertiary Education Union reported that the merger process had caused low morale and increased workload among staff members at Otago Polytechnic. The Union also expressed concerns about scant information about Te Pūkenga's direction, staff's place in the new organisation, and insufficient funding, and the loss of operational knowledge caused by job redundancies.

On 21 October, Acting CEO Winder stated that Te Pūkenga would consider staff redundancies as a means of reducing the organisation's deficit by NZ$35 million. This amount includes NZ$10m across work-based learning, NZ$25m across former polytechnics and the national office. Polytechnic staff have expressed concerns about the impact of the proposed redundancies on teaching and staff morale. As part of the cost-cutting exercise, Te Pūkenga's subsidiary Otago Polytechnic confirmed that it would undergo a NZ$2.7 million cost cut, which raised concerns about job security among staff.

Academic freedom
On 13 March 2023, Chief Executive Winder issued a statement telling Te Pūkenga staff including academics that they were "public servants" and had to remain "politically neutral" ahead of the 2023 New Zealand general election. Winder's statement was criticised by Prime Minister Chris Hipkins and National Party education spokesperson Simmonds who defended academic staff members' right to academic freedom. Similarly, Public Service Commissioner Peter Hughes stated that Te Pūkenga was a tertiary institute and was thus not subject to the Commission's code of conduct or general election guidance. Academic freedom (but not institutional autonomy) is granted to the Institute's academic staff and students under Section 318 of the Education and Training Act, 2020. 

In mid March 2023, Stuff reported that Te Pūkenga had published a style guide in February 2023 that discouraged the use of the words "student" and "trainee" in favour of the Māori word ākonga. In addition, the style guide discouraged the use of the words "employee" and "staff" except in formal settings. Te Pūkenga's style guide also discouraged the use of the words "husband," "wife," and "manmade" in favour of gender neutral terms. The style guide also discouraged the use of the word Treaty of Waitangi in favour of the Māori term Te Tiriti o Waitangi. The style guide was criticised for infringing on academic freedom by National Party education spokesperson Simmonds and several New Zealand academics including University of Canterbury geneticist Jack Heinemann, University of Auckland law professor Jane Kelsey, University of Auckland physicist Richard Easther, University of Waikato psychology academic Rebekah Graham, and University of Auckland social scientist Sereana Naepi.

References

External links

Te Pūkenga – New Zealand Institute of Skills and Technology
2020 establishments in New Zealand
Educational institutions established in 2020